A Killian–Jamieson diverticulum is an outpouching of the esophagus just below the upper esophageal sphincter.

The physicians that first discovered the diverticulum were Gustav Killian and James Jamieson. Diverticula are seldom larger than 1.5 cm, and are less frequent than the similar Zenker's diverticula. As opposed to a Zenker's, which is typically a posterior and inferior outpouching from the esophagus, a Killian–Jamieson diverticulum is typically an anterolateral outpouching at the level of the C5-C6 vertebral bodies, due to a congenital weakness in the cervical esophagus just below the cricopharyngeal muscle. It is usually smaller in size than a Zenker's diverticulum, and typically asymptomatic. Although congenital, it is more commonly seen in elderly patients.

References

External links

Esophagus disorders